Manhattan (sometimes styled MANH(A)TTAN) is an American drama television series based on the project of the same name that produced the first atomic weapons. While some historical figures appear in Manhattan, most characters are fictional, and the show is not intended to maintain historical accuracy.

The show was the first drama production for WGN America since the revival of Tribune's production arm as Tribune Studios. The series premiered on WGN America on July 27, 2014. The series earned critical acclaim throughout its run, but failed to secure adequate ratings. As a result, it was canceled on February 2, 2016, after its second season, becoming the first WGN America original series to be canceled.

Plot
Set in 1943 and 1944 at the time of the Manhattan Project, the series focuses on the scientists at Project Y and their families in the newly created Los Alamos, New Mexico, a town the outside world knows nothing about. The federal government tells the scientists only what they need to know, while the scientists keep secrets from their families.

The TV show is not intended to be historically accurate, but inspired by history. The show does reference many aspects of the actual Manhattan Project, and some historical figures such as head scientist Robert Oppenheimer. Other contributors to the Manhattan Project, such as Nobel Laureates Enrico Fermi (who moved to the site in September 1944) and Emilio G. Segrè, do not appear.

Cast

Main
 John Benjamin Hickey as Dr. Frank Winter, leader of an initially small group of scientists working on an implosion design weapon (loosely based on Seth Neddermeyer and the E-5 Group at the Los Alamos Laboratory)
 Olivia Williams as Dr. Liza Winter, Frank's wife and a botanist
 Ashley Zukerman as Dr. Charlie Isaacs, a rising young star of the Project
 Rachel Brosnahan as Abby Isaacs, Charlie's wife
 Daniel Stern as Dr. Glen Babbit, mentor to other scientists (season 1; special guest season 2)
 Katja Herbers as Dr. Helen Prins, one of the few women scientists
 Harry Lloyd as Paul Crosley, a British scientist who wants to advance at any cost
 Alexia Fast as Callie Winter, Frank and Liza's rebellious teenage daughter (season 1; guest season 2)
 Christopher Denham as Jim Meeks, a scientist
 Michael Chernus as Louis "Fritz" Fedowitz, a scientist
 William Petersen as Colonel Emmett Darrow (season 2), a United States military officer

Recurring
 David Harbour as Dr. Reed Akley, lead scientist for the Thin Man bomb design
 Eddie Shin as Dr. Sidney "Sid" Liao, a Chinese-American scientist
 Daniel London as Professor J. Robert Oppenheimer, the melancholic, somewhat reclusive, world-renowned theoretical physicist, and scientific director of the Los Alamos National Laboratory
 Mark Moses as Col. Alden Cox
 Carole Weyers as Elodie, a French switchboard operator.
 Richard Schiff as Mr. Fisher (aka "Occam")
 Jefferson White as Private First Class Cole Dunlavey (aka "Iowa")
 Peter Stormare as Lazar
 Josh Cooke as Lancefield
 Neve Campbell as Kitty Oppenheimer (season 2)
 Mamie Gummer as Nora (season 2)
 Griffin Dunne as Woodrow Lorentzen, a reporter and old friend of Liza Winter (season 2)

Production 
Television network WGN America premiered its first scripted show, the historical drama Salem, on April 20, 2014. Peter Liguori, CEO of WGN's parent, Tribune Media, emphasized a strategy of original content production as a way to improve the channel's prestige and profile. TV companies producing the show include Lionsgate Television, Skydance Television and Tribune Studios, a WGN affiliate. When announced in April 2014, 13 episodes were ordered.

The series began filming in mid-March across  in New Mexico.  On October 14, 2014, Manhattan was renewed for a second season. Production on season 2 wrapped on July 24, 2015.

David Saltzberg, a physicist at UCLA, acted as the scientific consultant for the show, and Alex Wellerstein, a historian of science at Stevens Institute of Technology who studies the history of nuclear weapons and secrecy, acted as a historical consultant for the show for Season 2, providing period detail to the writers.

Creator Sam Shaw said although that at first the show seems to be about World War II, and the development of the atomic bomb, it was about two eras: the development of the atomic bomb, and after dropping of it on Japan. Speaking about a potential third season Shaw said "the most complicated and morally fascinating and dramatic aspects of the history don't come until after the end of World War II." Shaw noted that only Fritz, Meeks, and Winters knew exactly what happened at the end of season 2 and that going forward he hoped he would get to write that story. Shaw also said "I hope we'll get to follow characters in this moment when Los Alamos goes from being the best kept secret in the world to being the most famous city on the planet."

Episodes

Season 1 (2014)

Season 2 (2015)

Reception

Critical reception
Season 1 of Manhattan received highly positive reception from television critics and has a Metacritic score of 78 out of 100, based on 23 "generally favorable" reviews. The review aggregation website Rotten Tomatoes reports a 90% "certified fresh" critics rating, with an average rating of 8.3/10 based on 30 reviews; the site's consensus reads: "Though slow to start, Manhattan is a top-notch drama thanks to a talented cast, beautiful cinematography, and a keen eye for period detail."

Season 2 received further acclaim, scoring an 80 out of 100 based on nine reviews on Metacritic. Rotten Tomatoes reports a 92% approval rating, with an average rating of 8.5/10 based on 13 reviews, and the site's consensus reading, "Manhattans slow-building intrigue and sense of impending doom deepen in season two, further enriching an already well-acted period drama."

Accolades
The series won the Primetime Emmy Award for Outstanding Main Title Design for the 67th Primetime Emmy Awards and also won the award for Excellence in Title Design at the 2015 South by Southwest festival. Justin Kirk received a nomination for the Critics' Choice Television Award for Best Guest Performer in a Drama Series for the 6th Critics' Choice Television Awards.

References

External links
 
 

2010s American drama television series
2014 American television series debuts
2015 American television series endings
English-language television shows
Historical television series
Lesbian-related television shows
Television series about the Manhattan Project
Serial drama television series
Television series based on actual events
Television series by Lionsgate Television
Television series by Skydance Television
Television series by Tribune Entertainment
Television series set in the 1940s
Television shows set in New Mexico
WGN America original programming